Rajdham is a village in Gogari block of Khagaria district of Bihar State, India.

Geography
Rajdham is one of the villages of Maheshkhunt Panchayat in Khagaria District, Bihar State. It is 6.5 km from its Block Gogri. It is located approx 19 km from its District Main City Khagaria and approx 155 km from its State Main City Patna. Kosi River passes through this village.

Education in Rajdham

There are many good schools in and near by the village.

List Of School:

1. Middle School, Rajdham
2. Pride India Central School, Rajdham, Khagaria 
3. Delhi Public School, Maheshkhunt 
4. Sardar Patel Memorial High School Rajdham Maheshkhunt
5. Chandrashekhar Singh Girls' High School, Maheshkhunt
6. D.A.V Public school, Dyanand nagar, Maheshkhunt
7. Oxford Computer Center, Maheshkhunt
8. Lokesh Bal Vikas Mandir, Maheshkhunt

Festivals in Rajdham

The festivals of Holi, Ram Navami, Durga Puja, Diwali, Chath Puja, Makar sankranti, Basant Panchami are celebrated here with enthusiasm.

Languages of Rajdham

The prominent languages spoken in  this village are Angika (Theti) and Hindi.
People understand bhojpuri, maithili and other languages too.

Agriculture in Rajdham

More than half of populations of Rajdham are associated with agriculture and allied sectors. Agriculture is the main source of income of the people of this village. Mainly Maize, Wheat, Paddy, Banana, Sugarcane, Sunflowers are produced at large scale. Though this area is flood affected but every year record production of these crops are seen.

Transportation

It is well connected village of Khagaria District with the main cities of Bihar, which has led this village to development path. National Highway NH 107 passes through this village, which connects Maheshkhunt, NH 31 to Saharsa and Purnia. Whole village is situated on both sides of NH 107.

 Nearest Railway Station: Maheshkunt Railway Station, Maheshkhunt (Main route Under Barauni-Katihar-Guwahati)
 Nearest Bus Station: Maheshkhunt Bus Stand (Connect NH31 and NH107)
 Nearest Airport: Patna Airport

Temples in Rajdham

1. Hardol Baba Sthan, Rajdham
2. Shiv Mandir, Rajdham
3. Bhagwati Sthan, Pachkhutti, Rajdham
4. Shiv Mandir, Dhanuk Toli, Rajdham

References

Villages in Khagaria district